Thomas John Pucadyil (born 1976) is an Indian molecular biologist, biochemist and a professor and chair of biology at the Indian Institute of Science Education and Research, Pune. Known for his studies on membrane biochemistry and vesicular transport, Pucadyil is an international research scholar of the Howard Hughes Medical Institute/Bill & Melinda Gates Foundation and a senior fellow of the Wellcome Trust- Department of Biotechnology. The Council of Scientific and Industrial Research, the apex agency of the Government of India for scientific research, awarded him the Shanti Swarup Bhatnagar Prize for Science and Technology, one of the highest Indian science awards, for his contributions to biological sciences in 2018.

Biography 

Thomas J. Pucadyil, born on 20 November 1976, to renowned plasma physicist and Padma Shri recipient, Pucadyil Ittoop John, graduated in biochemistry from St. Xavier's College, Ahmedabad of Gujarat University in 1997 and earned his master's degree from Maharaja Sayajirao University of Baroda in 1999. Subsequently, he enrolled for doctoral studies at the Centre for Cellular and Molecular Biology, Hyderabad and served as a National Brain Research Council postdoctoral fellow at CCMB for a year from 2004 to 2005. After securing the PhD in 2005, he moved to the US to join Scripps Research, as a post doctoral fellow where he worked as a Leukemia & Lymphoma Society fellow from 2007 to 2010. Returning to India in 2010, he joined the Indian Institute of Science Education and Research, Pune (IISER Pune) as an assistant professor and holds the position of an associate professor since 2016.

Research 
Pucadyil's research-focus is in the field of reconstruction biology and he leads a laboratory, Pucadyil Lab, at IISER Pune where he hosts several researchers who are involved in the studies of the rational design principles behind the formation of vesicles inside living cells. His studies have been documented by way of a number of articles; ResearchGate, an online repository of scientific articles has listed 85 of them.

Awards and honours 
Pucadyil, a member of the Guha Research Conference, has held such fellowships as DST-SERB fellowship (2016), Wellcome Trust/DBT India Alliance intermediate fellowship (2016) and the Career Development Grant of the Leukemia & Lymphoma Society (2007). In 2011, he received the associate-ship of the Indian Academy of Sciences, followed by the Wellcome Trust/DBT India Alliance senior fellowship in 2017. The same year, he was chosen for the International Research Scholar's Grant of the Howard Hughes Medical Institute and Bill & Melinda Gates Foundation, the only Indian among the 41 recipients to receive the  65,000 grant that year. The Council of Scientific and Industrial Research awarded him the Shanti Swarup Bhatnagar Prize, one of the highest Indian science awards in 2018.

Selected bibliography

See also 

 Transport vesicles
 Fission

Notes

References

Further reading

External links 
 
 
 

Recipients of the Shanti Swarup Bhatnagar Award in Biological Science
Indian scientific authors
Living people
Scientists from Kerala
Malayali people
Indian biochemists
Indian molecular biologists
Gujarat University alumni
Maharaja Sayajirao University of Baroda alumni
Academic staff of the Indian Institute of Science Education and Research, Pune
Scripps Research alumni
1976 births